The Koon House No. 4 is a historic house at 3004 U.S. Highway 167 in Sheridan, Arkansas, USA. It is a single story structure, built out of vertically placed small logs, split in half and set smooth side in and round side out. It is roughly rectangular in shape, with a cross gable roof. A rectangular section projects from on side near the rear, and it has a front porch recessed under a gable projecting from the left front. The house was built about 1940 by Hillary Henry "Pappy" Koon and is one of several houses in the area built by him in this distinctive manner.

The house was listed on the National Register of Historic Places in 1999.

See also
National Register of Historic Places listings in Grant County, Arkansas

References

Houses on the National Register of Historic Places in Arkansas
Houses completed in 1940
Buildings and structures in Grant County, Arkansas
National Register of Historic Places in Grant County, Arkansas